The London and North Eastern Railway (LNER) Peppercorn Class A1 is a type of express passenger steam locomotive. Forty-nine original Peppercorn Class A1s were built to the design of Arthur Peppercorn (who was the last Chief Mechanical Engineer (CME) of the LNER) during the early British Railways era, but all were scrapped with the discontinuation of steam, with none of the original production run surviving into preservation. In 2008, a brand new 50th Peppercorn A1 locomotive, 60163 Tornado, was completed.

Background 
Most of the former LNER Class A1 locomotives designed by Sir Nigel Gresley had been rebuilt as LNER Class A3 locomotives prior to this class being conceived. The few straggling LNER Class A1 locomotives that remained unrebuilt during the tenure of Peppercorn's predecessor, Edward Thompson, were redesignated by him as Class A10s in preparation for the construction of his new Class A1 locomotives. Thompson rebuilt the pioneer LNER Pacific Great Northern in 1945; originally this was the new Class A1, but the rebuild was not repeated.  Instead, initiated by Thompson but largely taken forward by his successor Arthur Peppercorn, Great Northern was designated Class A1/1, and a new class of Peppercorn A1s ordered.

The locomotives were designed to cope with the heaviest passenger trains in the post-war period on the East Coast Main Line (London – York – Newcastle – Edinburgh – Aberdeen) which consisted normally of trains with up to 15 coaches and up to 550 tons. The Peppercorn A1s were able to pull such a train on the flat at a speed of 60–70 mph (95-110 km/h). The class used a double Kylchap chimney system and, like previous LNER Pacifics, had a 3-cylinder arrangement.

Original locomotives

Construction 
The new A1s were ordered by the LNER but were delivered after the LNER had been nationalised to form part of British Railways at the start of 1948. The 49 engines were built at the Eastern Region's Doncaster and Darlington works between 1948 and 1949.

Withdrawal 

By summer of 1966, all 49 class members had gone for scrap. The last to be withdrawn from stock was No. 60145 Saint Mungo, after a working life of just 17 years. 60145 Saint Mungo was planned to be preserved by Geoff Drury; however, this ultimately was unsuccessful and none of the original locomotives were preserved.

List of original locomotives 

Below is a list of original Peppercorn A1 Locomotives

Notes on names
The names of the A1s were an eclectic mix including:
 Racehorses: Bois Roussel, Silurian, Scottish Union, Bongrace, Pommern, Foxhunter, Alcazar, Boswell, King's Courier, Aboyeur, Amadis, Willbrook, Flamboyant
 Names of people: W. P. Allen (an LNER locomotive driver who became a member of the Railway Executive in 1948), Archibald Sturrock, Patrick Stirling, H. A. Ivatt, Sir Vincent Raven, Wilson Worsdell, Edward Fletcher (Locomotive Superintendents of pre-grouping railways), Sir Walter Scott, Saint Mungo
 Names related to the works of Sir Walter Scott: Meg Merrilies, Hal o’ the Wynd, Kenilworth, Guy Mannering, Marmion, Borderer, Madge Wildfire, Redgauntlet, Bonnie Dundee.  Some of these names had previously been used on NBR J class locomotives
 Pre-grouping railway companies: North Eastern, Great Central, Great Eastern, North British
 Birds: Kittiwake, Curlew, Kestrel, Osprey, Sea Eagle, Peregrine
 Place-related names: Balmoral, Abbotsford (Sir Walter Scott's house), Midlothian, Holyrood, Bon Accord (motto of Aberdeen), Auld Reekie (a soubriquet for Edinburgh), Saint Johnstoun (an old name for Perth), Aberdonian

No. 60163 Tornado 

None of the original production run of 49 Peppercorn A1s survived the scrapyard to be preserved. However, in 2008, a brand new 50th A1 based on the original Peppercorn patterns, 60163 Tornado, was completed as the evolved member of the class.

Accidents and incidents
On 5 June 1950, locomotive No. 60153 Flamboyant was hauling an express passenger train which was derailed at Tollerton, North Yorkshire due to heat buckled track.
On 7 September 1962, No. 60123 H.A. Ivatt suffered harsh collision damage after running into a train at Offord. Four people were injured in the incident. It was withdrawn a month later and scrapped at Doncaster.
On 16 January 1964, No. 60120 Kittiwake collided with the rear end of a goods train in North Otterington. It was shortly withdrawn after the incident.
On 14 April 2018, locomotive No. 60163 Tornado was hauling an excursion train named "The Ebor Flyer" from London King's Cross to York. While traveling at 90mph around Sandy, south of Peterborough, the locomotive's inside motion failed.

Models 
Bachmann Branchline and Hornby make models in OO gauge, Graham Farish produce a model in N gauge and Accucraft (UK) make a live steam model in Gauge 1.

References

External links 

A1 Steam Locomotive Trust

A1 Peppercorn
4-6-2 locomotives
Railway locomotives introduced in 1948
Standard gauge steam locomotives of Great Britain
2′C1′ h3 locomotives
Scrapped locomotives
Passenger locomotives